Isaac Kontostephanos was a Byzantine admiral during the reign of Emperor Alexios I Komnenos (r. 1081–1118), marked by his incompetence in the wars against the Normans.

Biography
Isaac Kontostephanos first appears in 1080, during the imperial campaign against the rebel Nikephoros Melissenos. During this expedition, he fell off his horse and was nearly captured by Melissenos's Turkish allies, but was saved by George Palaiologos. He is next attested, holding the rank of protonobelissimos, at the 1094 synod of Blachernae.

By 1105, Kontostephanos had become a senior admiral (doux) in the Byzantine fleet. With the anticipated Norman invasion of Bohemond drawing near, Emperor Alexios I Komnenos (r. 1081–1118) named Kontostephanos megas doux (commander-in-chief of the imperial fleet) in succession to Landulf, and sent him to Dyrrhachium to intercept the Normans. On his own initiative, however, Kontostephanos resolved to attack the city of Otranto in Italy, which was defended by Emma of Hauteville. Although his forces could have taken the city by storm, Kontostephanos allowed himself to be involved in negotiations with Emma, which she dragged on until Norman reinforcements arrived. Defeated in battle by the newly arrived Norman troops, Kontostephanos and his fleet were forced to withdraw to the Albanian coast. Making Aulon his base, he began patrolling the Strait of Otranto. At the news that Bohemond's army was preparing to cross the sea, however, most of the army panicked and fled to Himara, while Kontostephanos was unable to reimpose order.

After Bohemond's successful landing, the emperor charged Kontostephanos with intercepting the Norman supply convoys, but here too he failed. After receiving letters from Landulf detailing Kontostephanos's incompetence, Alexios finally dismissed him in summer 1108 and replaced him with Marianos Maurokatakalon.

Family
Isaac was the progenitor of the most important branch of the Kontostephanos family, which rose to great prominence in the 12th century as it intermarried with the Komnenoi, the Doukai, the Angeloi, and other aristocratic families. They served mostly as military commanders. Isaac had several children:
 the panhypersebastos Stephen Kontostephanos, married Anna Komnene, the second daughter of Emperor John II Komnenos (r. 1118–43), and became megas doux of the fleet until he was killed at the siege of Corfu in 1149. 
 Andronikos Kontostephanos, married Theodora Komnene, a daughter of Adrianos Komnenos (archbishop of Bulgaria between 1139/43 - 1157 under the name John IV), who was son of sebastokrator Isaac Komnenos, elder brother of Alexios I. He led the campaign against Raymond of Antioch in 1144 and took part in the 1156 expedition to southern Italy.
 John Kontostephanos, became megas doux under Isaac II Angelos in 1186. 
 Alexios Kontostephanos, doux of Dyrrhachium in 1140, was probably also a son of Isaac.

References

Sources
 
 
 
 
 

11th-century births
12th-century deaths
11th-century Byzantine people
12th-century Byzantine people
Megaloi doukes
Generals of Alexios I Komnenos
Isaac